The National Agency for the Safety of Flight, is the Italian aircraft accident investigation agency. The ANSV is headquartered in Rome. The Presidency of the Council of Ministers of Italy oversees the agency. It is the Italian equivalent of the United States National Transportation Safety Board.

It was established according to legislative decree No. 66 on 25 February 1999. Prior to the establishment of the ANSV, after each aviation accident or incident, two investigations were carried out, including a perfunctory investigation by the airport director and a formal and technical investigation by an ad hoc committee appointed by the Minister of Infrastructure and Transport. Since the establishment of the ANSV, one investigation by the ANSV is carried out after an aviation accident or incident.

Accidents investigated by the ANSV
Linate Airport disaster
Tuninter Flight 1153
Air Algérie Flight 2208
Ryanair Flight 4102

See also

Aviation safety
Agenzia Nazionale per la Sicurezza delle Ferrovie – Rail accident investigation agency

References

External links
 ANSV 
  (English)

Italy
Aviation organisations based in Italy
Government of Italy
Government agencies established in 1999
1999 establishments in Italy